In biogeography, the Mediterranean Basin, also known as the Mediterranean Region or sometimes Mediterranea, is the region of lands around the Mediterranean Sea that have mostly a Mediterranean climate, with mild to cool, rainy winters and warm to hot, dry summers, which supports characteristic Mediterranean forests, woodlands, and scrub vegetation.

Geography

The Mediterranean Basin covers portions of three continents: Europe, Africa, and Asia. It is distinct from the drainage basin, which extends much further south and north due to major rivers ending in the Mediterranean Sea, such as the Nile and Rhône. Conversely, the Mediterranean Basin includes regions not in the drainage basin.

It has a varied and contrasting topography. The Mediterranean Region offers an ever-changing landscape of high mountains, rocky shores, impenetrable scrub, semi-arid steppes, coastal wetlands, sandy beaches and a myriad islands of various shapes and sizes dotted amidst the clear blue sea. Contrary to the classic sandy beach images portrayed in most tourist brochures, the Mediterranean is surprisingly hilly. Mountains can be seen from almost anywhere.

By definition, the Mediterranean Basin extends from Macaronesia in the west, to the Levant in the east, although some places may or may not be included depending on the view, as is the case with Macaronesia: some definitions only include Madeira and the Canary Islands while others include the whole Macaronesia (with the Azores and Cape Verde).

In Western Asia, it covers the western and southern portions of the peninsula of Anatolia, as far as Iraq, but excluding the temperate-climate mountains of central Turkey. It includes the Mediterranean Levant at the eastern end of the Mediterranean, bounded on the east and south by the Syrian and Negev deserts.

The northern portion of the Maghreb region of northwestern Africa has a Mediterranean climate, separated from the Sahara Desert, which extends across North Africa, by the Atlas Mountains. In the eastern Mediterranean the Sahara extends to the southern shore of the Mediterranean, with the exception of the northern fringe of the peninsula of Cyrenaica in Libya, which has a dry Mediterranean climate.

Europe lies to the north of the Mediterranean. The European portion of the Mediterranean Basin loosely corresponds to Southern Europe. The three large Southern European peninsulas, the Iberian Peninsula, Italian Peninsula, and the Balkan Peninsula, extend into and comprise much of the Mediterranean-climate zone. A system of folded mountains, including the Pyrenees dividing Spain from France, the Alps dividing Italy from Central Europe, the Dinaric Alps along the eastern Adriatic, and the Balkan and Rila-Rhodope mountains of the Balkan Peninsula divide the Mediterranean from the temperate climate regions of Western, Northwestern or Northern Europe, Central Europe, and Eastern Europe.

Geology and paleoclimatology
The Mediterranean Basin was shaped by the ancient collision of the northward-moving African–Arabian continent with the stable Eurasian continent. As Africa–Arabia moved north, it closed the former Tethys Sea, which formerly separated Eurasia from the ancient super continent of Gondwana, of which Africa was part. At about the same time, 170 mya in the Jurassic period, a small Neotethys ocean basin formed shortly before the Tethys Sea was closed at the eastern end. The collision pushed up a vast system of mountains, extending from the Pyrenees in Spain to the Zagros Mountains in Iran. This episode of mountain building, known as the Alpine orogeny, occurred mostly during the Oligocene (34 to 23 million years ago (mya)) and Miocene (23 to 5.3 mya) epochs. The Neotethys became larger during these collisions and associated folding and subduction.

About 6 mya during the late Miocene, the Mediterranean was closed at its western end by drifting Africa, which caused the entire sea to evaporate. There followed several (debated) episodes of sea drawdown and re-flooding known as the Messinian Salinity Crisis,  which ended when the Atlantic last re-flooded the basin at the end of the Miocene. Recent research has suggested that a desiccation-flooding cycle may have repeated several times  during the last 630,000 years of the Miocene epoch, which could explain several events of large amounts of salt deposition. Recent studies, however, show that repeated desiccation and re-flooding is unlikely from a geodynamic point of view.

The end of the Miocene also marked a change in the Mediterranean Basin's climate. Fossil evidence shows that the Mediterranean Basin had a relatively humid subtropical climate with summer rainfall during the Miocene, which supported laurel forests. The shift to a Mediterranean climate occurred within the last 3.2–2.8 million years, during the Pliocene epoch, as summer rainfall decreased. The subtropical laurel forests retreated, although they persisted on the islands of Macaronesia off the Atlantic coast of Iberia and North Africa, and the present Mediterranean vegetation evolved, dominated by coniferous trees and sclerophyllous trees and shrubs, with small, hard, waxy leaves that prevent moisture loss in the dry summers. Much of these forests and shrublands have been altered beyond recognition by thousands of years of human habitation. There are now very few relatively intact natural areas in what was once a heavily wooded region.

Flora and fauna

Phytogeographically, the Mediterranean Basin together with the nearby Atlantic coast, the Mediterranean woodlands and forests and Mediterranean dry woodlands and steppe of North Africa, the Black Sea coast of northeastern Anatolia, the southern coast of Crimea between Sevastopol and Feodosiya in Ukraine and the Black Sea coast between Anapa and Tuapse in Russia forms the Mediterranean Floristic Region, which belongs to the Tethyan Subkingdom of the Boreal Kingdom and is enclosed between the Circumboreal, Irano-Turanian, Saharo-Arabian and Macaronesian floristic regions.

The Mediterranean Region was first proposed by German botanist August Grisebach in the late 19th century.

The monotypic Drosophyllaceae, recently segregated from Droseraceae, is the only plant family endemic to the region. Among the endemic plant genera are:

Anagyris
Andryala
Aphyllanthes
Argania
Argantoniella
Bellardia
Biserrula
Bivonaea
Bolanthus
Boleum
Callicotome
Ceratocapnos
Ceratonia
Chamaerops
Chronanthus
Cladanthus
Coridothymus
Didesmus
Dorystoechas
Drosophyllum
Euzomodendron
Fedia
Guiraoa
Gyrocarion
Helicodiceros
Hermodactylus
Hutera
Hymenocarpus
Ionopsidium
Lafuentea
Lagoecia
Leuzea
Lycocarpus
Malope
Morisia
Ortegia
Petagnia
Petromarula
Phillyrea
Preslia
Putoria
Rothmaleria
Rosmarinus
Rupicapnos
Santolina
Staehelina
Soleirolia
Spartium
Tetraclinis
Trachelium
Tremastelma
Triplachne
Vella

The genera Aubrieta, Sesamoides, Cynara, Dracunculus, Arisarum and Biarum are nearly endemic. Among the endemic species prominent in the Mediterranean vegetation are the Aleppo pine, stone pine, Mediterranean cypress, bay laurel, Oriental sweetgum, holm oak, kermes oak, strawberry tree, Greek strawberry tree, mastic, terebinth, common myrtle, oleander, Acanthus mollis and Vitex agnus-castus. Moreover, many plant taxa are shared with one of the four neighboring floristic regions only. According to different versions of Armen Takhtajan's delineation, the Mediterranean Region is further subdivided into seven to nine floristic provinces: Southwestern Mediterranean (or Southern Moroccan and Southwestern Mediterranean), Ibero-Balearian (or Iberian and Balearian), Liguro-Tyrrhenian, Adriatic, East Mediterranean, South Mediterranean and Crimeo-Novorossiysk.

The Mediterranean Basin is the largest of the world's five Mediterranean forests, woodlands, and scrub regions. It is home to a number of plant communities, which vary with rainfall, elevation, latitude, and soil.
Scrublands occur in the driest areas, especially areas near the seacoast where wind and salt spray are frequent. Low, soft-leaved scrublands around the Mediterranean are known as garrigar in Catalan, garrigue in French, phrygana in Greek, tomillares in Spanish, and batha in Hebrew.
Shrublands are dense thickets of evergreen sclerophyll shrubs and small trees and are the most common plant community around the Mediterranean. Mediterranean shrublands are known as màquia in Catalan, macchia in Italian, maquis in French, and "matorral" in Spanish. In some places, shrublands are the mature vegetation type, and in other places the result of the degradation of former forest or woodland by logging or overgrazing, or disturbance by major fires.
Savannas and grasslands occur around the Mediterranean, usually dominated by annual grasses.
Woodlands are usually dominated by oak and pine, mixed with other sclerophyll and coniferous trees.
Forests are distinct from woodlands in having a closed canopy, and occur in the areas of highest rainfall and in riparian zones along rivers and streams where they receive summer water. Mediterranean forests are generally composed of evergreen trees, predominantly oak and pine. At higher elevations Mediterranean forests transition to mixed broadleaf and tall conifer forests similar to temperate zone forests.

The Mediterranean Basin is home to considerable biodiversity, including 22,500 endemic vascular plant species. Conservation International designates the region as a biodiversity hotspot, because of its rich biodiversity and its threatened status. The Mediterranean Basin has an area of 2,085,292 km2, of which only 98,009 km2 remains undisturbed.

Endangered mammals of the Mediterranean Basin include the Mediterranean monk seal, the Barbary macaque, and the Iberian lynx.

Ecoregions
The WWF identifies 22 Mediterranean forests, woodlands, and scrub ecoregions in the Mediterranean Basin, most of which featuring sclerophyll plant species:
Aegean and Western Turkey sclerophyllous and mixed forests (Greece, Turkey, North Macedonia,  Bulgaria)
Anatolian conifer and deciduous mixed forests (Turkey)
Canary Islands dry woodlands and forests (Spain)
Corsican montane broadleaf and mixed forests (France)
Crete Mediterranean forests (Greece)
Cyprus Mediterranean forests (Cyprus)
Eastern Mediterranean conifer–sclerophyllous–broadleaf forests (Lebanon, Iraq, Israel, Jordan, Palestine, Syria, Turkey)
Iberian conifer forests (Spain)
Iberian sclerophyllous and semi-deciduous forests (Portugal, Spain)
Illyrian deciduous forests (Albania, Bosnia and Herzegovina, Croatia, Greece, Italy, Montenegro, Slovenia)
Italian sclerophyllous and semi-deciduous forests (France, Italy, San Marino)
Mediterranean acacia–argania dry woodlands (Western Sahara, Morocco, Canary Islands (Spain))
Mediterranean dry woodlands and steppe (Algeria, Egypt, Libya, Morocco, Tunisia)
Mediterranean woodlands and forests (Algeria, Libya, Morocco, Tunisia)
Northeastern Spain and Southern France Mediterranean forests (France, Monaco, Spain)
Northwest Iberian montane forests (Portugal, Spain)
Pindus Mountains mixed forests (Albania, Greece, North Macedonia)
South Apennine mixed montane forests (Italy)
Southeastern Iberian shrubs and woodlands (Spain)
Southern Anatolian montane conifer and deciduous forests (Lebanon, Israel, Jordan, Syria, Turkey)
Southwest Iberian Mediterranean sclerophyllous and mixed forests (Portugal, Spain)
Tyrrhenian–Adriatic sclerophyllous and mixed forests (Croatia, France, Italy, Malta)
.

History

Neanderthals inhabited western Asia and the non-glaciated portions of Europe starting about 230,000 years ago. Modern humans moved into western Asia from Africa less than 100,000 years ago. Modern humans, known as Cro-Magnons, moved into Europe approximately 50–40,000 years ago.

The most recent glacial period, the Wisconsin glaciation, reached its maximum extent approximately 21,000 years ago, and ended approximately 12,000 years ago. A warm period, known as the Holocene climatic optimum, followed the ice age.

Food crops, including wheat, chickpeas, and olives, along with sheep and goats, were domesticated in the eastern Mediterranean in the 9th millennium BCE, which allowed for the establishment of agricultural settlements. Near Eastern crops spread to southeastern Europe in the 7th millennium BCE. Poppy and oats were domesticated in Europe from the 6th to the 3rd millennium BCE. Agricultural settlements spread around the Mediterranean Basin. Megaliths were constructed in Europe from 4500 – 1500 BCE.

A strengthening of the summer monsoon 9000–7000 years ago increased rainfall across the Sahara, which became a grassland, with lakes, rivers, and wetlands. After a period of climatic instability, the Sahara settled into a desert state by the 4th millennium BCE.

Historiography

One of the earliest modern studies of the Mediterranean was Fernand Braudel's La Méditerranéee et le monde méditerranéen à l époque de Philippe II (The Mediterranean and the Mediterranean World in the Age of Philip II), published in 1949. S.D. Goitein's multivolume study of the Cairo Geniza documents was another important contribution in the area of Mediterranean Jewish culture.

Agriculture

Wheat is the dominant grain grown around the Mediterranean Basin. Pulses and vegetables are also grown. The characteristic tree crop is the olive. Figs are another important fruit tree, and citrus, especially lemons, are grown where irrigation is present. Grapes are an important vine crop, grown for fruit and to make wine. Rice and summer vegetables are grown in irrigated areas.

See also

Ancient Egypt
Ancient Greece
Life zones of the Mediterranean region
Mediterranean wine climate
MISTRALS
Ottoman Empire
Phoenicia
Roman Empire
Zanclean flood

References

Further reading 
 
 Borutta, Manuel, Mediterraneum, EGO - European History Online, Mainz: Institute of European History, 2021, retrieved: March 8, 2021.

External links
Mediterranean Basin biodiversity hotspot (Conservation International)
Are wildfires a disaster in the Mediterranean basin? – A review
MedTrees: Trees and large shrubs of the Mediterranean Basin.

 
 
 
Mediterranean forests, woodlands, and scrub
Palearctic realm
Palearctic ecoregions
Natural history of Europe
Levant
Floristic regions
Regions of Europe
Geography of North Africa
Geography of Southern Europe
Geography of Western Asia
Geography of the Middle East
Regions of Eurasia
Regions of Africa